Sŏnch'ŏn County is a kun, or county, on the coast of the Yellow Sea in west-central North P'yŏngan province, North Korea.  To the north it borders Ch'ŏnma, to the east Kusŏng and Kwaksan, and to the west Tongrim; to the south, it borders nothing but the sea. Sŏnch'ŏn was reorganized in 1952, with two myŏn, or townships, being split off to form the new county of Tongrim.

History

Physical features
The terrain varies between hills and plains; numerous islands are also found along the indented coastline. The highest point is Kainbong (가인봉, 535 m), which is the source of the Tongrae River.  The year-round average temperature is 8.5 °C, with a January average of -9.2 °C and an August average of 23.6 °C.  The average annual rainfall is 1192 mm. The island of Sinmido hosts a peak of 532 m, Unjongsan, and is also home to a variety of plants normally found only in warm areas. Some 45% of the county's area is forestland.

Administrative divisions
Sŏnch'ŏn county is divided into 1 ŭp (town) and 24 ri (villages):

Economy
The local economy relies on agriculture, including livestock-raising and sericulture, as well as fishing and manufacturing. Local crops include rice, maize, tobacco and soybeans. Factories in Sŏnch'ŏn manufacture ironware, ceramics, and tobacco products.

Transportation

Sŏnch'ŏn county is served by the P'yŏngŭi Line of the Korean State Railway, which runs between P'yŏngyang and Sinŭiju.  In addition, a passenger ferry operates between Sinmido and the mainland.

Religion
In the late 19th and early 20th centuries, the area was a hotbed of Protestant Christian religious activity, with more than 50 churches. There were also 13 Buddhist temples. These were all converted or destroyed following the establishment of the DPRK.

Protests
In February 2011, the area and other cities in North P'yŏngan had rare protests, of a few score of people, calling for adequate provision of rice and power. At the time, news of the Arab Spring was spreading via Chinese TV channels and phone calls with defectors.

See also
Geography of North Korea
Administrative divisions of North Korea
North Pyongan

References

External links
 Pictures of Pyongan Province

Counties of North Pyongan